Stadium station is a San Diego Trolley stop on the Green Line. The elevated station has an island platform as well as side platforms. It was built in the parking lot of the former San Diego Stadium. The area around the station is undergoing re-development into San Diego State University's Mission Valley campus and the Snapdragon Stadium for the San Diego State Aztecs football team.

History 

This station opened on November 23, 1997 as part of the Blue Line Mission Valley Line extension to Mission San Diego station. The station, originally called Qualcomm Stadium station, was built in the parking lot of its namesake stadium, the home of the National Football League’s Chargers. The station saw heavy use on stadium event days. On non-event days, the stadium parking lots served as a massive park and ride facility. 

Blue Line service to this station was replaced by the Green Line on July 10, 2005 as part of the Mission Valley East extension. Before the opening of the Mission Valley East extension, this station was rebuilt to raise the platform to accommodate the new low-floor trolley vehicles, giving passengers level access to trains without using steps or a wheelchair lift.

The station was renamed after Qualcomm's naming rights to the stadium expired in June 2017, coinciding with the Chargers' departure from San Diego. 

The station closed on November 1, 2020, for two years to accommodate the demolition of San Diego Stadium and the construction of Snapdragon Stadium. The station briefly reopened on August 20, 2022, for a preview event at the new stadium and reopened permanently on September 3, 2022. A new plaza is planned to be constructed during redevelopment of the surrounding lots.

Station layout
There are two tracks, each served by a side platform and a shared island platform. East of the station is a siding for trains short-turning back to Downtown.

See also
 List of San Diego Trolley stations

References

Green Line (San Diego Trolley)
San Diego Trolley stations in San Diego
Railway stations in the United States opened in 1997
1997 establishments in California